The 2009 2. divisjon season was the third highest football (soccer) league for men in Norway.

26 games were played in 4 groups, with 3 points given for wins and 1 for draws. Strømmen, Follo, Sandnes Ulf and Ranheim were promoted to the 2010 Norwegian First Division. Number twelve, thirteen and fourteen were relegated to the 3. divisjon, except for the two number twelve teams with the most points. The winning teams from each of the 24 groups in the 3. divisjon each faced a winning team from another group in a playoff match, resulting in 12 playoff winners which were promoted to the 2. divisjon.

League tables

Group 1

Group 2

Group 3

Group 4

Top goalscorers
 28 goals:
  Morten Eriksen, Sandnes Ulf
 21 goals:
  Eirik Markegård, FK Tønsberg
  Trond Haugstad, Strømmen
  Remond Mendy, Raufoss
  Mato Grubisic, Valdres
 20 goals:
  Christian Østli, FK Tønsberg
 19 goals:
  Christopher Joyce, Pors Grenland
 18 goals:
  Øyvind L. Gausdal, Vindbjart
  Joakim Rudolfsen, Mo
 17 goals:
  Vebjørn Svensson, FF Lillehammer

Promotion playoff

References
Tables: Group 1, Group 2, Group 3, Group 4
Goalscorers

Norwegian Second Division seasons
3
Norway
Norway